The 2015 FIBA Europe Under-20 Championship was the 18th edition of the FIBA Europe Under-20 Championship. The competition took place in Lignano Sabbiadoro and Latisana, Italy, from 7 to 19 July 2015.

Participating teams
  (Runners-up, 2014 FIBA Europe Under-20 Championship Division B)
  (Winners, 2014 FIBA Europe Under-20 Championship Division B)
 
 
 

 

 

 

  (3rd place, 2014 FIBA Europe Under-20 Championship Division B)

First round
In this round, the twenty teams were allocated in four groups of five teams each. The top three teams advanced to the Second Round. The last two teams of each group played in the Classification Games.

Group A

Group B

Group C

Group D

Second round

Group E

Group F

Classification groups for 13th – 20th places

Group G

Group H

Classification playoffs for 9th – 20th place

Classification games for 17th – 20th place

Classification games for 13th – 16th place

Classification games for 9th – 12th place

Championship playoffs

Quarterfinals

Classification games for 5th – 8th place

Semifinals

Final classification games

Match for 19th place

Match for 17th place

Match for 15th place

Match for 13th place

Match for 11th place

Match for 9th place

Match for 7th place

Match for 5th place

Bronze medal match

Final

Final standings

Team Roster:
Nikola Rebić,
Rade Zagorac,
Marko Gudurić,
Petar Rakićević,
Dragan Apić,
Božidar Babović,
Ognjen Jaramaz,
Dejan Davidovac,
Aleksandar Bursać,
Đorđe Kaplanović,
Đoko Šalić,
Marko Tejić
Head Coach:
Vladimir Đokić

Awards

All-Tournament Team
  Manu Lecomte
  Nikola Rebić 
  Marko Gudurić 
  Juancho Hernangómez 
  Emircan Koşut

References

External links
FIBA official website

FIBA U20 European Championship
2015–16 in European basketball
2015–16 in Italian basketball
International youth basketball competitions hosted by Italy
July 2015 sports events in Europe